The Watchers Out of Time and Others is an omnibus collection of stories by American writer  August Derleth, inspired in part by notes left by H. P. Lovecraft after his death and presented as a "posthumous collaboration" between the two writers (Derleth acted as Lovecraft's literary executor). It was published in an edition of 5,070 copies.  Several of the stories relate to the Cthulhu Mythos and had appeared previously in the earliest collections The Lurker at the Threshold, The Survivor and Others, The Shuttered Room and Other Pieces, The Dark Brotherhood and Other Pieces and other Arkham House publications.

Some controversy exists among Lovecraft's admirers as to the ethics of presenting the stories as collaborative works. Upon this volume's publication, Donald Wandrei, one of Arkham House's founders, wrote letters to reviewers complaining that the stories were essentially Derleth's own works, incorporating fragments of unpublished Lovecraft prose. Gahan Wilson agreed that the stories "should really be billed as his [Derleth's] own, and merely based on the notes and letters of Lovecraft, and on the Lovecraftian mythos as he [Derleth] saw it, and no more than that."

Contents

 "Foreword", by April Derleth
 The Lurker at the Threshold
 "The Survivor"
 "Wentworth's Day"
 "The Peabody Heritage"
 "The Gable Window"
 "The Ancestor"
 "The Shadow Out of Space"
 "The Lamp of Alhazred"
 "The Shuttered Room"
 "The Fisherman of Falcon Point"
 "Witches' Hollow"
 "The Shadow in the Attic"
 "The Dark Brotherhood"
 "The Horror from the Middle Span"
 "Innsmouth Clay"
 "The Watchers Out of Time"

Notes
The title story at the end of the book was left incomplete and unfinished at the time of Derleth's death.

References

Sources

1974 short story collections
Horror short story collections
Arkham House books